Steven Maurice Rogers (born July 30, 1968) is an American retired professional basketball player.

A 6'5" and 190 lb shooting guard, Rogers played his freshman year of college basketball at Middle Tennessee State before transferring to Alabama State for his sophomore, junior and senior seasons.

He was selected by the New Jersey Nets in the 2nd round (40th overall) of the 1992 NBA Draft, though he never played in a regular season game for the Nets. He played overseas in Europe and South America before returning to Alabama State, where he has worked as their director of football operations and as an assistant basketball coach. In May 2020, Rogers was named Head Boys Basketball Coach of the Prattville High School Lions.

Personal life 
Rogers is a member of Kappa Alpha Psi fraternity.

See also
List of NCAA Division I men's basketball career free throw scoring leaders

References

External links
Profile at TheDraftReview.com
Article at Jet Magazine
Profile at TBLStat.net

1968 births
Living people
Alabama State Hornets basketball coaches
Alabama State Hornets basketball players
American expatriate basketball people in Argentina
American expatriate basketball people in France
American expatriate basketball people in Greece
American expatriate basketball people in Italy
American expatriate basketball people in Poland
American expatriate basketball people in Turkey
American men's basketball players
Basketball coaches from Alabama
Basketball players from Montgomery, Alabama
Boca Juniors basketball players
Darüşşafaka Basketbol players
Mens Sana Basket players
Middle Tennessee Blue Raiders men's basketball players
New Jersey Nets draft picks
Peiraikos Syndesmos B.C. players
Shooting guards
SIG Basket players
Śląsk Wrocław basketball players
Sportspeople from Montgomery, Alabama
Tofaş S.K. players
Türk Telekom B.K. players